Velero III was a motor vessel built for George Allan Hancock at Craig Shipbuilding, Long Beach, California, with the intention of using the vessel for both business and research. Hancock was a donor to the University of Southern California with Velero III eventually becoming R/V Velero III in research associated with the university and a sculpture of the vessel appears on the Hancock Institute for Marine Studies at U.S.C. The ship was purchased for war use by the Navy on December 15, 1941 and being commissioned as the USS Chalcedony designated PYC-16 on weather duty for the Hawaiian Sea Frontier.

In 1947 the vessel was being operated as the yacht Velero III for Nicholas A. Kessler and in 1948 was registered to Independent Tankships as the yacht Ahmady with the home port of Wilmington, Delaware. In 1949 the vessel was being operated under the Kuwati flag.

Origins
George Allan Hancock had inherited Rancho La Brea and made his fortune in oil but had developed a scientific interest as a result of excavations at the La Brea Tar Pits on the ranch and, after exploring the pools on the ranch with his first boat, going to sea and eventually earning his master's papers. He had a number of boats with two earlier ones named Velero and Velero II. Captain Hancock took the first Velero from Los Angeles on January 30, 1921 on a cruise that was not scientific but later took Velero II as far as Panama with an amateur marine biologist that deepened his interest in scientific voyages. A Hancock owned and captained vessel following Velero II, Oaxaca, had carried twelve passengers including two representatives of the California Academy of Sciences on a voyage as far as the Galápagos Islands in 1927. In 1931 Hancock had a new vessel constructed and returned to the name Velero with that being the third of the name.

Construction and design
Velero III was explicitly designed by naval architect G. Bruce Newby at Hancock's instruction to both appear and perform in a similar manner to the new United States Coast Guard cutters being built on the Pacific Coast.

Interior spaces had many yacht like features but were intentionally simple but a "grand stairway" connected owner's and guest's quarters. The interior was insulated with cork and had forced ventilation.

Electrical power was provided by two 20 kilowatt belt driven generators on the main shaft and two 75 kilowatt generators driven by 115 shaft horsepower Winton engines with 900 ampere-hour batteries on line to provide power before generators are started or as emergency power. Fresh water, was provided in two equally divided separate systems for drinking and another for washing and showering.

Navigating equipment included Sperry gyrocompass and autopilot, radio range finder and a fathometer. Velero III carried two  steel motor whaleboats and two  wooden fishing and shore boats.

Voyages
Hancock's early voyages collected specimens but became organized into a more scientific collection with creation of the Allan Hancock Foundation for Scientific Research, the vessel itself becoming registered to the Allan Hancock Pacific Expeditions and Hancock Hall on the University of Southern California campus to house the collection. Velero III was donated with the foundation to the university in 1939. From 1931 until 1941 the vessel's collection efforts were largely in marine invertebrate zoology between San Francisco and Peru and at the end equaled or surpassed collection efforts in that field by previous ships with Hancock Hall at the University being built as a repository for the collection and data. 
An example of the work is found in the description of documentation of the early voyage extending from Mexico to the  Galápagos during which collection was made at twenty-three stations.

Velero III expeditions included one exception to the Eastern Pacific work with a voyage into the Caribbean. Voyages between 1931 and presentation of the vessel to the university in 1939 were conducted by Captain Hancock. On one such trip to the Galápagos Captain Hancock would attempt to identify two bodies found on Marchena Island and check on a colony of German "Back to nature" enthusiasts on Floreana Island, then known as Charles Island.

Navy acquisition
On December 15, 1941 Velero III was acquired by the Maritime Commission from the University of Southern California and turned over to the Navy which had the vessel converted to wartime use at San Diego Marine Construction Company before commissioning February 27, 1942 as USS Chalcedony designated PYC-16 with Lieutenant (junior grade) Erwin E. Smith, USNR commanding. Chalcedony served at San Diego with the 11th Naval District until sailing for Hawaii on April 21, 1942 for weather station duty with the Hawaiian Sea Frontier. On November 5, 1945 Chalcedony departed Pearl Harbor arriving San Francisco November 15 where she was decommissioned on January 10, 1946 and on October 17 delivered to the Maritime Commission for disposal.

Post war
At the end of the war Velero III was examined by Hancock for resuming foundation work but his conclusion was that a new vessel was required. In 1947 the vessel was being operated as the yacht Velero III for Nicholas A. Kessler, Los Angeles, and in 1948 was registered to Independent Tankships, Washington, D.C., as the yacht Ahmady with the home port of Wilmington, Delaware. In 1949 the vessel was being operated under the Kuwati flag.

Successor
On April 11, 1948 Velero IV was launched at National Iron Works, San Diego with dignitaries of the University of Southern California, the Foundation, Navy and science participating. That vessel is still active as of 2015 operating out of Seattle.

References

Bibliography

External links
 How Velero III, A Fantastic Watercraft, Enriched Early Ocean Research (KCET Los Angeles, Hadley Meares, April 14, 2020)
 Velero III Sculpture on the east side of the Alan Hancock Foundation Building, University of Southern California. (Public art, sculptures, fountains and murals at the University of Southern California, Los Angeles)
 Allan Hancock Foundation Collection (USC Digital Library)

1931 ships
Individual yachts
University of Southern California
Research vessels of the United States
Patrol vessels of the United States Navy